Mike Brooks aka Mikey Brooks, Prince Michael (born Edmund Brooks, 1953, Westmoreland, Jamaica) is a reggae singer whose career stretches back to the early 1970s.

Biography
Brooks performed regularly at the 'Idler's Rest' on Chancery Lane in Kingston, and landed a job at Channel One Studios building rhythms with the group Skin Flesh & Bone. His first record release was with the group The Tots (who also included Norris Reid and in Brooks' words 'a guy called Tony'), who released a single in 1975 called "Earth Is The Fullness", recorded at Lee "Scratch" Perry's Black Ark studio, and released on Brooks' Harvest label. The band was not successful, but Brooks would often contribute to recording sessions at the Black Ark organized by Jah Lloyd. Brooks re-emerged as a solo singer in the mid-1970s, working with producers such as Alvin Ranglin, and achieving hits with singles such as "Guiding Star" (1977), "Come Sister Love", "Grooving", "Open The Door", and "What a Gathering". He also recorded the combination single "Who Have Eyes To See" with Prince Far I. He moved to the United Kingdom, and joined the British Reggae Artists Against Famine Appeal, singing on the "Let's Make Africa Green Again" charity single. In 1990 he recorded an album with Glen Brown, and followed it in 1995 with Hardcore Lover, an album on which he was joined by Delroy Wilson and Pat Kelly.

Brooks also worked as a producer, and along with Jah Lloyd, set up his own 'Teams' label in the late 1970s.

Albums
What a Gathering (1976) Burning Sounds
True Love (1977) Harvest
Rum Drinker (197?) Duke Reid
One Love (1983) Vista Sounds
Respect Due (1985) Good Times
Mike Brooks and Glen Brown Meet Rhythm Foundation ina Sound Clash (1990) Rhythm Foundation
Hardcore Lover (1995) Pre
The Good Old Days Of The 70s (1998) (Joseph Cotton and Mike Brooks)
They Trying to Conquer (2000) Charm
Anthology 1972-1985 (2001) M10
Need Love (2002) Teams (as Prince Michael)
Book of Reveletion (2003) I Sound
The Earth Is the Fullness (2004) Moll Selekta
Just The Vibes Moll Selekta (Mike Brooks and Various Artists)
Break Free - Treasure Isle Classics (2006) Teams
Living My Culture (2005) Trojan Records
Rise Up (2006)
Cross Over (2006)
The Lost Album Nocturne (Mike Brooks and U-Roy)
Dub Zone Teams (Mike Brooks and Stamper Doctor)
Solid Ground (Mikey Brooks and The Upsetters)
Gimme Your Love, Harvest

References

External links
Mike Brooks at Roots Archives
Mike Brooks at ReggaeID
Rebel Base interview

Jamaican reggae musicians
1953 births
Jamaican Rastafarians
People from Westmoreland Parish
Living people